Balezinsky District (Balezino joros) is an administrative and municipal district (raion), one of the twenty-five in the Udmurt Republic, Russia. It is located in the north of the republic. Its administrative center is the rural locality (a settlement) of Balezino. Population:  38,443 (2002 Census);  The population of Balezino accounts for 46.6% of the district's total population.

Geography
Rivers flowing through the district include the Cheptsa, the Kep, the Lopya, the Kama, the Pyzep, the Lyuk, and others.

History 
The district was created on July 15, 1929 by merging Balezinskaya and Yagoshurskaya Volosts of Glazovsky Uyezd.

Demographics
Ethnic composition (according to the 2002 Census): Udmurt people: 57.6%; Russians: 30.9%; Tatars: 9.8%.

References

Sources

Districts of Udmurtia